Lake Ozark is a city in Camden and Miller counties in the U.S. state of Missouri, near its namesake, the Lake of the Ozarks.  The population was 2,077 at the 2020 census.

History
A post office called Lake Ozark has been in operation since 1932. The community took its name from nearby Lake of the Ozarks.

Bagnell Dam was added to the National Register of Historic Places in 2008.

The segment of Bagnell Dam Boulevard from Horse Bend Parkway to the Bagnell Dam is named "Bagnell Dam Strip." There are two muffler mans named Injun Joe and another named Country Bumpkin.

Geography

Climate
Lake Ozark has a humid subtropical climate.  Summers are hot and humid, with thunderstorms and other severe weather common.  Winters are generally cold with mild periods, but the temperature of the lake can alter the climate with heavy fog and milder weather than other municipalities further away from the lake.

Demographics

2020 census

2010 census
As of the census of 2010, there were 1,586 people, 715 households, and 455 families living in the city. The racial makeup of the city was 96.5% White, 0.2% African American, 0.7% Native American, 0.8% Asian, 0.2% Pacific Islander, 0.3% from other races, and 1.3% from two or more races. Hispanic or Latino of any race were 1.2% of the population.

There were 715 households, of which 25.5% had children under the age of 18 living with them, 52.9% were married couples living together, 7.6% had a female householder with no husband present, 3.2% had a male householder with no wife present, and 36.4% were non-families. 29.8% of all households were made up of individuals, and 9.4% had someone living alone who was 65 years of age or older. The average household size was 2.22 and the average family size was 2.71.

The median age in the city was 48 years. 19.2% of residents were under the age of 18; 6.5% were between the ages of 18 and 24; 19.7% were from 25 to 44; 36.9% were from 45 to 64; and 17.7% were 65 years of age or older. The gender makeup of the city was 51.3% male and 48.7% female.

2000 census
As of the census of 2000, there were 1,489 people, 649 households, and 427 families living in the city. The population density was 211.6 people per square mile (81.7/km2). There were 1,143 housing units at an average density of 162.4 per square mile (62.7/km2). The racial makeup of the city was 96.24% White, 1.34% Native American, 0.47% Asian, 0.40% African American, 0.47% from other races, and 1.07% from two or more races. Hispanic or Latino of any race were 2.15% of the population.

There were 649 households, out of which 26.5% had children under the age of 18 living with them, 53.5% were married couples living together, 8.8% had a female householder with no husband present, and 34.1% were non-families. 28.4% of all households were made up of individuals, and 6.3% had someone living alone who was 65 years of age or older. The average household size was 2.29 and the average family size was 2.76.

In the city, the population was spread out, with 21.6% under the age of 18, 7.7% from 18 to 24, 26.7% from 25 to 44, 30.5% from 45 to 64, and 13.6% who were 65 years of age or older. The median age was 41 years. For every 100 females there were 103.1 males. For every 100 females age 18 and over, there were 104.4 males.

The median income for a household in the city was $37,386, and the median income for a family was $40,515. Males had a median income of $26,750 versus $21,667 for females. The per capita income for the city was $20,830. About 11.3% of families and 13.1% of the population were below the poverty line, including 19.2% of those under age 18 and 5.8% of those age 65 or over.

Infrastructure

Roads 
A four-lane highway connecting the Lake of the Ozarks Community Bridge to Highway 54 opened in December 2011. Route 242 (MO 242) opens new areas of land for development and speeds connections to the residential areas of Lake Ozark and Sunrise Beach. At US 54 and Route W junction, an interchange was built to replace a spotlight intersection. Construction began early with the interchange opening in 2021. The entire project was completed later that same year.

Fire Department 
In November 2018 the Lake Ozark Fire District acquired a $500,000 fireboat.

References

External links
Lake Area Chamber of Commerce

Cities in Camden County, Missouri
Cities in Miller County, Missouri
Cities in Missouri